Anna van Rijn College is a secondary school in the town of Nieuwegein. The school teaches all forms of Dutch secondary education. In November 2020, Mr M. Nomes was appointed as director.

The school is named after Johanna van Rijn van Jutphaes. She was a founder of a poor foundation and village school. 

Secondary schools in the Netherlands
Schools in Utrecht (province)
Nieuwegein